Arthur Duncombe (11 February 1840 – 12 June 1911), was a British Conservative politician.

Duncombe was the son of Admiral the Hon. Arthur Duncombe, a younger son of Charles Duncombe, 1st Baron Feversham. His mother was Delia, daughter of John Wilmer Field. He entered the House of Commons for Howdenshire in 1885, a seat he held until 1892.

Duncombe married Katherine Henrietta Venezia, daughter of Henry John Milbank, in 1869. Their daughter Muriel Katherine married George Nicholas de Yarburgh-Bateson, 4th Baron Deramore, and was the mother of Richard de Yarburgh-Bateson, 6th Baron Deramore. Duncombe died in June 1911, aged 71. His wife survived him by fifteen years and died in October 1926.

See also
Baron Feversham

References

www.thepeerage.com

External links 

1840 births
1911 deaths
Conservative Party (UK) MPs for English constituencies
UK MPs 1885–1886
UK MPs 1886–1892
Arthur